Höxter Rathaus is a railway station located in Höxter, Germany.

Geschichte

The station is located on the Altenbeken–Kreiensen railway. The train services are operated by NordWestBahn. The station is on the eastern side of the town, close to the river Weser.

Many bus services depart from outside the station.

Rail services
"Höxter-Rathaus" station is a stop for the RB84 services towards Paderborn Hauptbahnhof and Kreiensen. The service is operated by NordWestBahn.

Bus routes

 R22 - Höxter, Bahnhof/Rathaus - Beverungen - Bad Karlshafen, Bahnhof (http://www.weser-egge-bus.de/) 
 R21 - Höxter, Bahnhof/Rathaus - Albaxen - Stahle - Holzminden, Bülte (http://www.weser-egge-bus.de/) 
 R90 - Höxter, Bahnhof/Rathaus - Höxter, Bahnhof/Rathaus (Stadtverkehr) (www.bbh-paderborn.de)
 HX1 - Höxter, Bahnhof/Rathaus - Höxter, Bahnhof/Rathaus (Stadtverkehr) (www.bbh-paderborn.de)
 HX2 - Höxter. Bahnhof/Rathaus - Höxter, Weserbergland-Klinik (www.bbh-paderborn.de) 
 HX3 - Höxter, Bahnhof/Rathaus - Höxter-Lütmarsen - Höxter-Bosseborn, Mitte (www.bbh-paderborn.de) 
 HX4 - Höxter, Bahnhof/Rathaus - Höxter-Brenkhausen - Höxter-Bödexen, Wendeplatz (www.bbh-paderborn.de) 
 HX5 - Höxter, Bahnhof/Rathaus - Höxter, Corvey (www.bbh-paderborn.de) 
 556 - Höxter, Weserbrücke - Boffzen - Fürstenberg, Hußmannplatz (http://www.nph.de)

Notes

Railway stations in North Rhine-Westphalia
Railway stations in Germany opened in 1950
Buildings and structures in Höxter (district)